The title of Duke de La Rochefoucauld is a French peerage belonging to one of the most famous families of the French nobility, whose origins go back to lord Rochefoucauld in Charente in the 10th and 11th centuries (with official evidence of nobility in 1019). It became Rochefoucauld in the 13th century.

Origins of the name
Authors have advanced, but without evidence, that the first member of this family, Adémar, known as Amaury or Esmerin, by Viscounty of Limoges, or the son of the lord Hugh I of Lusignan. This latter hypothesis could be reinforced by the armorial bearings of the family. The work of André Debord leaves it to the house of Montbron in the 12th century.

The seigniory of La Roche was originally a barony in the 13th century. The descendants of Foucauld I de La Roche and of Jarsande, united their name Foucauld.

Lords then Barons de La Rochefoucauld (10th–15th centuries)
 Adémar de La Roche, (952–1037).
 Foucauld I de La Roche (son of preceding), Lord de La Roche, (978–1047), married and had four children
 Guy I de La Roche (son of preceding), founded in 1060 the priory of Saint-Florent de La Rochefoucauld.
 Guy II de La Roche (son of preceding), Lord de La Rochefoucauld (1081). He married Eve, they had three children.
 Guy III de La Roche (son of preceding), Lord de La Rochefoucauld (died 1120).
 Aymar de La Roche (son of preceding), seigneur de La Rochefoucauld et de Verteuil (died in 1140). Led several wars against Wulgrin II, count of Angoulême. He married Mathilde de Chabanais.
 Guy IV de La Roche (son of preceding), Lord de La Rochefoucauld, Verteuil, Marthon, Blanzac. He was in war against William of Angoulême; in 1170 he assisted the dedication of the Abbaye de Saint-Amant-de-Boixe. Married the daughter of Aimery, vicomte de Rochechouart, and they had two children.
 Foucauld II de La Roche (son of preceding) Lord de La Rochefoucauld. He served in the army of the King Philip II Augustus, and was made prisoner in 1198 at the battle of Gisors. He was father of four children.
 Guy V de La Rochefoucauld (son of preceding), founded the Cordeliers Convent d'Angoulême in 1230.
 Aimeri I de La Rochefoucauld (brother of preceding and son of Foucauld II), Lord de La Rochefoucauld in 1219, and of Verteuil comte de la Marche. He died after 1250. He married Létice de Parthenay, and they had five children.
 Guy VI de La Rochefoucauld (son of preceding), Lord de La Rochefoucauld, de Verteuil, de Marthon, de Saint Claud, de Saint Laurent, de Blanzac et de Cellefrouin, rallied to the cause of Hugues VII de Lusignan, comte de La Marche, against the King of France Louis IX. In 1295, he retired to the abbaye de Grosbos, and he died th same year. He married Agnès de Rochechouart, and they had nine children.
 Aimeri II de La Rochefoucauld (son of preceding), baron de La Rochefoucauld, Lord de Verteuil, de Marthon, de Saint Claud, de Saint Laurent, de Blanzac, de Monteil et de Cellefrouin (v.1265–1295). In 1280 he married Dauphine de La Tour-d'Auvergne, and they had five children.
 Guy VII de La Rochefoucauld (son of preceding), baron de La Rochefoucauld. Served the King Philip V of France against the County of Flanders (1317–1318). Excommunicated by Aiguelin de Blaye (bishop of Angoulême). Founder of the Couvent des Carmes de La Rochefoucauld (1329). Killed next to the King of France (Jean II) at the Battle of Poitiers (1356). He married in 1309 Agnès de Culant and they had nine children.
 Aimeri III de La Rochefoucauld (son of preceding), baron de La Rochefoucauld. Rendered service to the King Philippe VI (1338). Died 16 September 1362. He married Rogette de Grailly, and they had Gui VIII.
 Guy VIII de La Rochefoucauld (son of preceding), baron de La Rochefoucauld, governor of l'Angoumois, councillor et Grand Chamberlain of France of Kings Charles V, Charles VI and of Philip II of Burgundy. Battled in Bordeaux, William de Montferrand, partisan of the English. He married Jeanne de Luxembourg, then Marguerite de Craon who gave him eight children.
 Foucauld III de La Rochefoucauld (son of preceding), baron de La Rochefoucauld, councillor, chamberlain of king Charles VII (died 1467). Chevalier (1451), participated in the siege of Fronsac. Rescued King Charles VII and his château (from 12 July until 27 July 1453, at the battle of Castillon, which marked the end of the Hundred Years War. He married Jeanne de Rochechouart who gave him three children.
 Jean I de La Rochefoucauld, baron de La Rochefoucauld, councillor and Grand Chamberlain of France for the kings Louis XI and Charles VIII, and governor of Bayonne.

Comtes de La Rochefoucauld (and princes de Marcillac) (16th Century)
King Francis I created the barony de La Rochefoucauld in April 1528.

 François I de La Rochefoucauld, comte de La Rochefoucauld (died 1541). Chambellan of Kings Charles VIII and Louis XII.  He married Louise de Crussol.
 François II de La Rochefoucauld, comte de La Rochefoucauld, prince de Marcillac, baron de Verteuil, etc. (1494–1533). Married Anne de Polignac (1518).
 François III de La Rochefoucauld (1521 – 24 August 1572), comte de La Rochefoucauld, prince de Marcillac, comte de Roucy, baron de Verteuil, etc. He married first Sylvie Pic de la Mirandole, and second Charlotte de Roye (died 8 April 1571), comtesse de Roucy, sister-in-law to Louis I de Bourbon-Condé. Protestant, he was killed at the St. Bartholomew's Day massacre.
 François IV de La Rochefoucauld (1554 – 15 March 1591) (son of preceding). Comte de La Rochefoucauld, prince de Marcillac, comte de Roucy, baron de Verteuil, etc. Married with Claude d'Estissac (27 September 1587). Protestant, he was killed at Saint-Yrieix by the Catholic League (French).

Ducs de La Rochefoucauld (17th–21st Centuries)

Louis XIII raised the comté de La Rochefoucauld into a duchy-pairie on 22 April 1622.

 François V de La Rochefoucauld (son of preceding), duc de La Rochefoucauld (7 September 1588 – 8 February 1650). Catholic, married to Gabrielle du Plessis-Liancourt (July 1611).

 François VI de La Rochefoucauld (son of preceding), duc de La Rochefoucauld (15 December 1613 – 17 March 1680). Married Andrée de Vivonne (20 January 1628). moralist writer (Maximes, Mémoires), He wrote a history of the Fronde.
 François VII de La Rochefoucauld (son of preceding), duc de La Rochefoucauld (15 June 1634 – 12 January 1714). Grand veneur de France. Married Jeanne du Plessis-Liancourt, one of his cousins.
 François VIII de La Rochefoucauld (son of preceding), duc de La Rochefoucauld (17 August 1663 – 22 April 1728). Married Magdeleine Charlotte le Tellier de Louvois, daughter of François Michel Le Tellier de Louvois.
 François IX de La Rochefoucauld (son of preceding), duc de La Rochefoucauld (1681–1699).
 Alexandre de La Rochefoucauld (son of François VIII), duc de La Rochefoucauld (29 September 1690 – 1762). Married Elisabeth-Marie-Louise-Nicole de Caylard de Toiras d'Amboise (30 July 1715).
 François X de La Rochefoucauld (son of Alexandre)(1717–1718)
 François XI de La Rochefoucauld (son of Alexandre)(1720–1721)
 Marie-Louise-Elisabeth (daughter of Alexandre). Married (28 February 1732) to her cousin Jean-Baptiste Louis Frédéric de La Rochefoucauld de Roye, duc d'Anville. As Alexandre had no surviving male heir, by letters patent of Louis XV, the title duc de La Rochefoucauld was transmitted to the male issue of Marie-Louise-Elisabeth on the condition that she married a member of the La Rochefoucauld family. She chose her cousin Jean-Baptiste.
 Louis-Alexandre de La Rochefoucauld (1743–1792, assassinated), son of Marie-Louise-Elisabeth and Jean-Baptiste. He inherited two ducal titles and is known as duc de La Rochefoucauld-d'Anville. Member of the Académie des sciences, member of the Assembly of notables de 1787, deputy of the nobility at the French States-General of 1789. He was a victim of the September massacres in Gisors. He died without heir, and the title passed to his first cousin.

 François XII (Alexandre-Frédéric) duc de La Rochefoucauld-Liancourt (Paris, 11 January 1747 – 27 March 1827). Philanthropist, creator of the École des Arts et Métiers, propagator of vaccination in France. It was he who, on 12 July 1789, responded to Louis XVI who asked "It is a revolt?": "No, Sire, it's a Revolution".  He was in the liberal opposition party during the Bourbon Restoration.
 François, duc de La Rochefoucauld (1765-1848), duc de La Rochefoucauld (Paris, 8 September 1765 – 3 September 1848). Married Marie-Françoise de Tott (1770–1854), at La Haye (24 September 1793).  His brother was Frédéric Gaëtan, marquis de La Rochefoucauld-Liancourt, (1779–1863).
  François XIV de La Rochefoucauld, duc de La Rochefoucauld (The Hague, 11 September 1794 – Paris, 11 December 1874). Married in (Paris, 10 June 1817) with Zénaide Chapt de Rastignac (b. Paris, 1798 – Paris, 19 December 1875). Alfred de La Rochefoucauld, duc de La Roche-Guyon, second son of François XIV de La Rochefoucauld and Zénaide Chapt de Rastignac is the start of the cadet branch of the family La Rochefoucauld – La Roche-Guyon
  François XV de La Rochefoucauld, duc de La Rochefoucauld (14 April 1818 – 4 December 1879). Married (Paris, 1852) with Radegonde-Euphrasie Bouvery (Paris, 13 March 1832 – Paris, 7 November 1901).
  François-Alfred-Gaston XVI, duc de La Rochefoucauld (Paris, 21 April 1853 – Monaco, 24 February 1925). Married (11 February 1892) with Mattie-Elizabeth Mitchell (Portland (Oregon), 28 August 1866 – Paris, 21 February 1933).  They rest at the chapel of château de La Rochefoucauld. Mattie-Elizabeth Mitchell was the daughter of U.S. Senator John H. Mitchell.
 François XVII de La Rochefoucauld (François-Marie-Alfred) (Paris, 25 June 1905 – Paris, 11 March 1909). Interred in the chapel of château.
 Marie-François-Gabriel-Alfred, duc de La Rochefoucauld (Paris, 27 September 1854 – Paris, 29 July 1926). Brother of François XV, the ducal title was transferred to him.  Married (5 June 1884) with Pauline Piscatory de Vaufreland.
 Jean de La Rochefoucauld, duc de La Rochefoucauld, duc de Liancourt, prince de Marcillac, duc d'Anville (Paris, 10 March 1887 – Paris, 3 January 1970). Married (Paris, 27 December 1917) with Edmée Frish de Fels (Paris, 1895–1991).
 François XVIII de La Rochefoucauld, duc de La Rochefoucauld, duc de Liancourt, duc d'Anville (Paris, 12 December 1920 – 29 novembre 2011). Married (Paris, 11 October 1950) with Sonia Marie Matossian.
 François XIX de La Rochefoucauld (François-Alexandre), 15th duc de La Rochefoucauld, 10th duc de Liancourt, duc d'Anville, prince de Marcillac (born 2 April 1958, Neuilly-sur-Seine), son of François XVIII.
 François de La Rochefoucauld, 11th duke de Liancourt, prince de Marcillac (born 1986), heir to the ducal title, son of François XIX.

Armorial

See also
 Peerage of France
 List of French peerages
 List of French dukedoms

Notes

References

External links

 Château de La Rochefoucauld
 Armorial de La Rochefoucauld

Dukes of La Rochefoucauld
Noble titles created in 1622